A large number of authors choose to use some form of initials in their name when it appears in their literary work. This includes some of the most famous authors of the 20th century – D. H. Lawrence, J. D. Salinger, T. S. Eliot, J. R. R. Tolkien, etc. – and also a host of lesser-known writers.

Well-known initials and their corresponding full names are listed below.

A

B

C

D

E

F

G

H

I
 I. A. Richards – Ivor Armstrong Richards
 I. A. R. Wylie – Ida Alexa Ross Wylie
 Iain M. Banks – Iain Menzies Banks
 I. F. Stone – Isidor Feinstein Stone
 I. McC. Wilson – Ibbie McColm Wilson

J

K

L

M

N

O
 O. E. Rølvaag – Ole Edvart Rølvaag
 O. Henry – pen-name of William Sydney Porter
 O. Douglas – pen-name of Anna Masterton Buchan

P

R

S

T

U
 U. A. Fanthorpe – Ursula Askham Fanthorpe
 Ursula K. Le Guin or (once) U. K. Le Guin – Ursula Kroeber Le Guin

V
 V. C. Andrews – Cleo Virginia Andrews
 V. S. Naipaul – Vidiadhar Surajprasad Naipaul
 V. S. Pritchett – Victor Sawdon Pritchett

W

Y
 Y. L. E. – Mary Whitwell Hale (the concluding letters of her name)

Z
 ZZ Packer – Zuwena Packer (second Z is decorative)

Human names
Initialisms
Literary initials